Ndumu virus is an RNA virus in the genus Alphavirus. It was first isolated in 1961 from culicine mosquitoes collected in northern Natal, Union of South Africa.

References

Alphaviruses